Naweng Township is a township in Luocheng Mulao Autonomous County, Guangxi, China.

Administrative division
As of 2021, the township is divided into one community and five villages: 
Naweng Community
Banyang
Kencai
Dongmin
Shefu
Minzu

History
The region came under the jurisdiction of Tianhe County during the Republic of China.

In 1968, it belonged to Qiaoshan People's Commune. It was incorporated as a township in 1984.

Geography
The township lies at the northwest of Luocheng Mulao Autonomous County, bordering Jian'ai Township to the west, Qiaoshan Township to the south, Huanjiang Maonan Autonomous County to the northwest, and Baotan Township to the east.

It is also the highest peak in the county.

Climate

Economy
The economy of the township has a predominantly agricultural orientation, including farming and pig-breeding. Significant crops include rice and corn. Cassava is one of the important economic crops in the region.

Demographics

The 2019 census reported the township had a population of 3,975.

References

Bibliography

 

Divisions of Luocheng Mulao Autonomous County